Mr. Impossible is the sixth studio album by New York based American experimental noise band Black Dice. It was released on April 10, 2012, on Ribbon Music.

Track listing 

"Pinball Wizard" - 5:10
"Rodriguez" - 4:21
"The Jacker" - 4:23
"Pigs" - 3:27
"Spy Vs. Spy" - 4:43
"Outer Body Drifter" - 5:37
"Shithouse Drifter" - 4:12
"Carnitas" - 8:17
"Brunswick Sludge (Meets Front Range Tripper)" - 5:50

References

Black Dice albums
2012 albums